The Cathedral Church of Saint Joseph – also known as St Joseph's Cathedral, Menevia Cathedral or Swansea Cathedral – is a Grade II-listed Roman Catholic cathedral in Swansea, Wales. It is the seat of the Bishop of Menevia and mother church of the Diocese of Menevia. The cathedral was built in the late nineteenth century and is located in the Greenhill area of Swansea.

History
Originally built as a church, St Joseph's was conceived by Father Wulstan Richards, OSB who came to Greenhill in 1875. It was designed by Peter Paul Pugin and took two years to build at a cost of £10,000. The building was officially opened on 25 November 1888 while still under construction. Built as a church, it was converted to a cathedral in 1987 for the redefined Diocese of Menevia. It was designated a Grade II listed building on 30 March 1987.

Description
The plan of the building is that of an apsidal chancel flanked by side chapels with a seven-bay aisled nave, a polygonal tower with spire in the north-west corner and twin porches on the western facade. Its walls are coursed bull-nosed masonry with bath stone dressings and red Dumfries stone in the nave piers and responds. The cathedral has a modern pantile roof and there is a gabled parapet, topped with a finial on the western side of the building above a small arched opening over a four-light Geometric traceried window. The nave has three-light clerestory traceried windows and the east facade has a lower clerestory and a three-light window under a corbelled gable with a finial. The ceiling has radiating ribs that extend to the walls.

See also
Saint Joseph

References

External links
Diocese of Menevia: The Cathedral
Artwork at St Joseph's Cathedral, Swansea

Roman Catholic churches completed in 1889
19th-century Roman Catholic church buildings in the United Kingdom
Grade II listed churches in Swansea
Grade II listed cathedrals in Wales
Mass media and culture in Swansea
Saint Joseph
Roman Catholic cathedrals in Wales
Roman Catholic Diocese of Menevia